Jake Michel (born 19 September 1997)  is an Australian Paralympic swimmer. At the 2020 Summer Paralympics, he won a silver medal.

Personal 
Michel was born on 19 September 1997 and has an intellectual disability. He is  6 ft 7 in tall. He attended Gumdale State School and Seton College in Brisbane.

Swimming career 
Michel is a breaststroke specialist and classified as SB14. His Paralympic swimming career started in 2014 and he was selected in Australian Dolphins’ development squad in 2018. His first international competition was the 2018 Pan Pacific Para-swimming Championships in Cairns, QLD, where he blitzed the field in the men's 100 m breaststroke SB4-9/11-13 heats but was not eligible to compete in the final due to being a development squad member. At the 2019 Australian Swimming Championships, in Adelaide,  he won gold in a Men's 50 m and 100 m Breaststroke Multi-Class events.

At the 2019 World Para Swimming Championships in London he finished fourth in the men's 100 m breaststroke SB14 in an Oceania record. At the 2021 Australian Swimming Trials in Adelaide, his 1:04.35 set an Australian 100 m Breaststroke SB14 record.

At the 2020 Tokyo Paralympics, in his only event, Michel won the silver medal in the Men's 100 m breaststroke SB14. His time of 1:04.28 was less than one second behind the gold medal winner Naohide Yamaguchi of Japan.

At the 2022 World Para Swimming Championships, Madeira, Michel won two silver medals -  Men's 100 m Breaststroke SB14 and Mixed 4 × 100 m medley relay S14.

References

External links 
 
 
 

1997 births
Living people
Intellectual Disability category Paralympic competitors
Male Paralympic swimmers of Australia
Swimmers at the 2020 Summer Paralympics
Paralympic silver medalists for Australia
Paralympic medalists in swimming
Medalists at the 2020 Summer Paralympics
Medalists at the World Para Swimming Championships
Australian male breaststroke swimmers
S14-classified Paralympic swimmers